The Cinema Audio Society Awards are an annual awards ceremony given by the Cinema Audio Society that honor outstanding achievements in sound mixing. These awards have been presented by the Cinema Audio Society since 1994.

The competition is open to feature films and television programs released or aired during the calendar year. The winners are revealed in a sealed envelope ceremony during the Cinema Audio Society awards banquet the following spring. Winners are selected entirely by a written balloting of the C.A.S. active members.

The awards also include a Filmmaker Award, Career Achievement Honoree, a Student Recognition Award and Technical Achievement Award.

Category

Film
 Outstanding Achievement in Sound Mixing for a Motion Picture – Live Action
 Outstanding Achievement in Sound Mixing for a Motion Picture – Animated
 Outstanding Achievement in Sound Mixing for a Motion Picture – Documentary

Television
 Outstanding Achievement in Sound Mixing for Television Series – One Hour
 Outstanding Achievement in Sound Mixing for Television Series – Half Hour
 Outstanding Achievement in Sound Mixing for Television Movie or Limited Series
 Outstanding Achievement in Sound Mixing for Television Non Fiction, Variety or Music – Series or Specials

References

External links
 Cinema Audio Society official website

 
American film awards
American television awards
Awards established in 1964